Lee David Buchanan (born 7 March 2001) is an English professional footballer who plays as a left-back for Bundesliga club Werder Bremen. He has represented England internationally at youth levels U19, U20 and U21.

Club career
On 12 August 2019, Buchanan made his professional debut with Derby County in the EFL Cup against Scunthorpe United. He scored the only goal of the game in the 78th minute to take Derby through to the second round. He made his league debut on 24 August 2019, starting in the 1–1 draw against West Bromwich Albion, playing the entire 90 minutes.

In July 2022 Buchanan joined Werder Bremen, newly promoted to the Bundesliga, on a free transfer from Derby County. After a legal loophole allowed Buchanan out of his contract following the sale of Derby County, Derby would not be entitled to any compensation for the transfer, with them asking for a FIFA tribunal in order to receive a fee. On 29 July 2022, it was confirmed that Derby would receive "full training compensation", understood to be a six-figure sum.

Buchanan scored his first goal for Bremen on 20 August 2022, scoring the first Bremen goal in a dramatic 3–2 win at Borussia Dortmund.

International career
On 30 August 2019, Buchanan received his first international call up as a member of the England U19s squad and eventually made his debut for that age group during a 3–1 defeat to France in Marbella on 9 October 2019.

On 13 October 2020, he made his debut for the England U20s during a 2–0 victory over Wales at St. George's Park. 

On 6 November 2020, Buchanan received his first call up to the England U21s. He made his U21 debut as a substitute during a 3–1 win over Andorra U21s at Molineux Stadium on 13 November 2020.

Career statistics

Honours
Individual
Bundesliga Rookie of the Month: August 2022

References

2001 births
Living people
English footballers
Association football fullbacks
English Football League players
Derby County F.C. players
SV Werder Bremen players
English expatriate footballers
English expatriate sportspeople in Germany
Expatriate footballers in Germany